Physopyxis ananas is a species of thorny catfish found in the lowlands of the Essequibo and Amazon basins.  It is found in the countries of Brazil, Guyana, Peru and Venezuela.  This species grows to a length of  SL.  They prefer to live in submerged organic litter in shallow waters.

References 
 

Doradidae
Fish of South America
Fish of Brazil
Fish of Peru
Fish described in 2005